Joephy Chan Wing-yan (born on 1 December 1990) is a Federation of Trade Unions politician in Hong Kong, who is currently a member of the Legislative Council, representing New Territories South West. She is a former member of the Sham Shui Po District Council for Lai Kok from 2016 to 2019.

Biography 
Chan's father is Chan Chi-kwong, president of the Hong Kong Customs Officers Association and former vice chairman of the Federation of Trade Unions (FTU). She went to the United Kingdom to study since middle school, and graduated from the University of Hong Kong and the University of London. She holds a Bachelor of Economics and Finance from the HKU and a Bachelor of Laws from the University of London. Later, she joined FTU as a community officer in Sham Shui Po.

During the 2015 Hong Kong local elections, Chan represented the Federation of Trade Unions in the Lai Kok constituency seat of Sham Shui Po District Council and competed with Federick Fung, then a member of the Legislative Council of the ADPL. In the end, she won with 2,531 votes, while former ADPL member Wong Chung-kei got 215 votes at the same time.

However, on 2019 Hong Kong local elections, she was defeated by Li Kwing of the ADPL, losing her bid for re-election.

After losing the district council election, she opened her YouTube channel to comment on current affairs and became an internet celebrity; she also runs a YouTube channel with another unsuccessful district councillor candidate, Navis Ha Wing-ka.

In the 2021 Hong Kong legislative election, she represented the Federation of Trade Unions in the newly created New Territories South West constituency. Chan won 62,690 votes and became the youngest member of the 7th Legislative Council of Hong Kong.

Controversies

Fake news on COVID-19 
In April 2020, Chan posted a video on her YouTube channel titled "A new discovery by British and German scientists debunks the conspiracy of the United Kingdom and the United States to claim compensation from China. The source is the United States and Australia? The first case appeared in September last year? Both the United Kingdom and the United States have a guilty conscience?" The content quoted the new coronavirus study by the University of Cambridge research team pointed to the origin of the virus as the United States or Australia. As of 28 April, the video had more than 380,000 views. An investigation by the Hong Kong news agency, FactWire, found that the video was taken out of context and misinterpreted the research results.

Dr. Peter Forster, an expert who led the research team, responded to the FactWire inquiry and stated that the purpose of the research is not to find the source of the virus at all, but to analyze how the virus mutates over time and spreads among humans. He also said that data showed that the patients in the early stage of the virus outbreak were generally from East Asians, which strongly indicated that the virus spread among them in the early stage of the outbreak.

Pro-police comments 
In September 2020, Chan and another pro-establishment figure, Navis Ha, commented on a pregnant woman who was pushed down by the police during a demonstration on the first anniversary of the Prince Edward station attack. She described the pregnant woman as a "criminal woman" and questioned her "after being interviewed by the media."

On 29 September, Hong Kong Police commissioner, Chris Tang, took the initiative to mention during the Yau Tsim Mong District Council meeting that on 31 August and 6 September, during the police operations at the Mong Kok demonstration site, a pregnant woman was pushed down on the day. Tang said that the demonstration scene was very chaotic. Some people did shout "pregnant women", but not everyone present could hear it.

References

External links

1990 births
Living people
Alumni of the University of Hong Kong
Alumni of the University of London
District councillors of Sham Shui Po District
Democratic Alliance for the Betterment and Progress of Hong Kong politicians
Hong Kong Federation of Trade Unions
HK LegCo Members 2022–2025
Members of the Election Committee of Hong Kong, 2021–2026
Hong Kong pro-Beijing politicians